Pittsfield, Massachusetts is a city in the United States.

Pittsfield may also refer to the following places in the US:

Settlements
 Pilot Hill, California, formerly Pittsfield
 Pittsfield, Illinois, a city
 Pittsfield, Maine, a town
 Pittsfield (CDP), Maine, the main village in the town
 Pittsfield, New Hampshire, a town
 Pittsfield (CDP), New Hampshire, the main village in the town
 Pittsfield, New York, a town
 Pittsfield, Vermont, a town
 Pittsfield, Wisconsin, a town
 Pittsfield (community), Wisconsin, an unincorporated community in the town
 Pittsfield Township, Pike County, Illinois
 Pittsfield Charter Township, Michigan
Pittsfield, Michigan, a former settlement
 Pittsfield Township, Lorain County, Ohio
 Pittsfield Township, Warren County, Pennsylvania

Structures
 Pittsfield Building, a skyscraper in Chicago, Illinois